Quba is a city and the administrative centre of the Quba District of Azerbaijan. The city lies on the north-eastern slopes of Shahdag mountain, at an altitude of 600 metres above sea level, on the right bank of the Kudyal river. It has a population of 38,100 (2010).

History 
Quba was mentioned in works of various European geographers, in ancient Arabic and Albanian sources. The castle built by the ruler Anushiravan in the 11th century was called "Bade-Firuz Qubat", and in the Arabic sources of the XII century Quba was mentioned as "Cuba". In the 13th century, in the Dictionary of Geographical names of Arabian scientist Hamabi it was mentioned among the Azerbaijani cities as Kubba, and in the sources of 16th century Quba was referred to as "Dome".

Guba (Quba) city originated from the riverside village of Gudial. In the mid-18th century, after moving his residence from Khudat, Hussain Ali became Quba's Khan (tribal Turkic Muslim ruler) and raised fortress walls around the city. He thereafter attempted to create a state separate from other Azerbaijani khanates. The position of the Quba khanate grew stronger during the reign of Fatali Khan (1758–1789), son of Hussain Ali Khan.

Nevertheless, Quba Khanate, like other Transcaucasian khanates, was occupied by Czarist Russia in the early 19th century and formally annexed to the Russian Empire under the agreement of 1813. After the rehabilitation Quba was included in the Derbent province in 1840 and then in the Kuba Uyezd of the Baku Governorate in 1860.

Alexandre Dumas, Russian orientalist Berezin, the writer Bestuzhev-Marlinsky, the Norwegian scholar and adventurer Thor Heyerdahl visited Quba at the time.

Quba is also a center of carpet weaving industry. There is located a carpet making company called "Qadim Quba". The carpet "Golu Chichi" woven here in 1712 is now exhibited in the Metropolitan Museum in New York.

Contemporary 

Quba has enjoyed strong economic growth over the last decade, much of it spurred by tourism and the construction industry.

There are 155 educational facilities in Quba. 135 high schools, 15 preschool and 5 out of school child education training facility. Out of 135 schools 27 are primary schools, 43 are high school which provide 9 years education, 65 provides eleven year education. In January 2017 these schools hosted 24,620 students.

Quba's cuisine has largely been affected by its multicultural history. Quba's signature cuisine includes Quba tıxması, spicy kebab, sac, Quba baklava and tandir kebab.

The officially registered population of Quba in 2010 was 38,150. The majority of the population is Azerbaijanis, while Tats and Lezgians constitute other minorities.

Points of Interest

Juma Mosque
Juma Mosque was built in the 19th century. The mosque was built from the red brick and it was erected in 1802. It is also called "Jama". This mosque was constructed in typical Quba province style mosques. The brick for the mosque were made in the village of Igryg. In appearance it resembles a faceted cylinder, and it's shaped like a regular octagon. Inside of the mosque there is a big hall crowned with a huge 16 m diameter dome.

Sakina-Khanum Mosque
Sakina-Khanum Mosque was built in 1854 by the widow of Abbasgulu Bakikhanov. It was erected in memory of her deceased husband. The mosque was built from red bricks and is similar to faceted cylinder. Each facet has a window in the form of a semicircular arch. The top of the facade is surrounded by an original eaves made from small bricks. From top this stately building is crowned with a big white metal dome in the shape of a multi-faceted helmet. The top of the dome is decorated by a graceful thin spike.

Chuhur hamam
Chuhur hamam is a bathhouse. The hamam is unique in its beehive shaped dome made of brick. The building of the bathhouse was built from the red brick. Its large dome enabled it to maintain the right temperature and humidity inside the house. The house has a quadrangular shape and it has 6 rooms, 2 doors and 6 windows. Water was supplied from the well under the bath or from the city waterpipes. In his time, Alexandre Dumas bathed in this bathhouse, during his stay in Quba. 150 years later, his great-grandson visited these places. The bathhouse was the main resting place for the Quba people and it was used until 1985. The Chuhur hamam is no longer operational.

The House-museum of Abbasgulu Bakikhanov 
The Museum of Local History named after Abbasgulu Bakikhanov was founded in 1943 in Quba. The museum was opened in the building, located along Ardabil Street, in which Bakikhanov himself lived at the time. The building dates back to the 19th century. There are more than 10 thousand different exhibits on the museum territory which is 742 sq. m. in total. More than 3,000 people visit this museum every year.

Portal Frame Bridge 
The only bridge that has survived to this day, also called the Kudyalchay Bridge. It is one of the seven bridges that existed in the Quba district in the 17th–19th centuries. This bridge was built in 1894 on the draft of Alexander III. 14 of its spans with a total length of 275 metres and a width of 8 metres are made of burnt bricks. This design allows the bridge to remain intact even during heavy mudflows and floods. The bridge has recently been restored and is protected by the state as an architectural monument. This is the only bridge with such structure in Azerbaijan.

Nizami Park 
It is said that this park, named after Persian poet Nizami Ganjavi, was built by captured Germans in 1946. A statue of the poet is erected in the park. There are bas-reliefs, depicting scenes from the works of Nizami around the monument along the avenues.

Olympic complex 
The Olympic complex, located 120 km from Baku, was opened on October 11, 2003. The area of this recreational and sports center is 16 hectares. There are facilities for the development of football, mini-football, basketball and volleyball. There are two-story cottages, spacious apartments, as well as a conference hall with a capacity of 200 people on the territory of the complex; the largest of 5 halls in this complex is designed for 2000 spectators. One of the two small training halls is equipped with simulators, and the other with a boxing ring. Wrestlers can use the auxiliary room. The football field, which accommodates 5,100 spectators, is equipped with all the amenities that meet the requirements of this sport. The 50-meter pool is suitable for both training and competition. There are 3 stands, accommodating 1010 people.

Guba Genocide Memorial 

The Guba Genocide Memorial was opened in 2013 on the site of a mass grave discovered in April 2007. the memorial was created by the Heydar Aliyev Foundation in remembrance of the victims killed in 1918.

Climate

Twin cities 
Quba is twinned with the following cities:
  Erzin, Turkey, since 2011
  Kant, Kyrgyzstan, since 2016
  Ma'alot-Tarshiha, Israel, since 2019

Notable locals 
 Kamal Mamedbekov (20 March 1924 – 2 September 1997), Azerbaijani and Soviet scientist, academician of the International Academy of Architecture of the Eastern Countries, honored architect of Azerbaijan SSR, PhD in theory and history of architecture and restoration of architectural monuments.
 Leyla Mamedbekova (12 May 1922 – 23 May 2006), Azerbaijani and Soviet scientist, pathologist, honored scientist of Azerbaijan SSR, professor. She was the first female professor in Azerbaijan in the field of pathology, the first female forensic medical expert, and the first female chief pathologist of Azerbaijan.
 Mir Jafar Baghirov (5 September 1895 – 26 May 1956), politician, the communist leader of the Azerbaijani SSR.
 Farhad Veliyev (1 November 1980), footballer.
 Zulfiyya Khanbabayeva (16 October 1967), Azerbaijani singer and performer.

Gallery

See also 
 Guba mass grave
 Qırmızı Qəsəbə - Red Town

References 

Populated places in Quba District (Azerbaijan)